San Felice sul Panaro is a comune (municipality) in the province of Modena in the Italian region Emilia-Romagna, located about  northwest of Bologna and about  northeast of Modena.
 
San Felice sul Panaro since Roman times has been an important center of the central Po valley in northern Italy. The main activity was farming until the development of agriculture related industries during the 20th century.

2012 earthquakes
The region was struck by a two earthquakes in May 2012. The first earthquake, with a magnitude of 6.0, occurred on May 20, 2012. Although no residents of San Felice sul Panaro were reported to have died, the town's Rocca Estense castle was severely damaged by the quake.

A 5.8 magnitude earthquake struck the region On May 29, 2012, killing at least 17 people and collapsing churches and factories. About 200 people were injured 14,000 people were left homeless. At least three of the deaths occurred in San Felice sul Panaro when the roof of a machine shop collapsed on workers.

References

External links
 Images of San Felice sul Panaro, with detailed informations. 
  Movie on the "Rocca Estense", the castle of San Felice sul Panaro

Cities and towns in Emilia-Romagna